The list of sled dog races contains dozens of contests created by supporters of mushing, the sport of racing sled dogs. It is unknown when the first sled dog race was held. Humans have domesticated dogs for thousands of years, and sled dogs have been used for transportation in Arctic areas for almost as long. The first sled dog race to feature a codified set of rules was the All-Alaska Sweepstakes, which first took place in 1908. This was followed in 1917 by the American Dog Derby, which was the first sled dog race outside Alaska or the Yukon. In 1929 the Laconia World Championship Sled Dog Race" was first held in the city of Laconia, New Hampshire. The first race was won by legendary musher, Leonhard Seppala, famous for his role in the 1925 "Great Race of Mercy", as well as, his lead dog Togo and kennel dog Balto. The Laconia sprint race is an annual event today over 90 years later. In 1932, sled dog racing was a demonstration sport at the 1932 Winter Olympics in Lake Placid, New York, but was only included in one other winter olympics in a slightly different form of sled dog racing known as pulka.

The most famous sled dog race is the Iditarod Trail Sled Dog Race, an annual 1000-mile race across Alaska. It commemorates the 1925 serum run to Nome. The first idea for a commemorative sled dog race over the historically significant Iditarod Trail was conceived Dorothy Page, the chair of the Wasilla-Knik Centennial Committee. Even though the race known today was not first run until 1973, thanks to the work of Joe Redington and his supporters. Joe Redington and the Iditarod helped restart worldwide interest in mushing, specifically in long-distance events.

Since mushing's resurgence, the sport has proliferated and sled dog races are hosted in towns around the world, from Norway and Finland to Alaska and Michigan. Due to the cold temperatures needed for sled dog racing, most races are held in winter in cold climates, but occasional carting events, typically known as dryland races, have been held in warmer weather. Other similar sports that using mushing as a means for transport include; carting, pulka, dog scootering, skijoring, freighting, and weight pulling. These are not included in this list because they do not use sleds.

A resurfaced race in 2020 is the Klondike Dog Derby, a 40-mile race around Lake Minnetonka in Excelsior, Minnesota. The race began in the 1930s and died out in 1998, until recently restarting. The majority of sled dog races in North America are held close to the northern border of the United States or farther north. Well-attended races in the United States such as the John Beargrease Sled Dog Marathon, Apostle Island Sled Dog Race, and the U.P. 200, all take place in the upper regions of Minnesota, Wisconsin, and Michigan, respectively. After these races, the majority of dog sled races take place farther north, in Canada or Alaska. The Klondike Dog Derby is one of few held in a more urban area that is not in the far north. Bringing the sport to an urban area of Minnesota has brought attention from local news sources and residents, allowing for first-hand familiarization and education of the sport of mushing that is otherwise hard to come across in an area that is not in the far north. The accessory events held the weekend of the Klondike Dog Derby include the Hug-a-Husky event, Meet the Musher, and allotted time for the public to hear musher's talk and answer questions on the sport. These events follow the same outline as the Klondike Dog Derby originally had, starting in the 1930s during Hennepin County's winter ice carnivals. The original race took place during a festival held annually by the Works Progress Administration called "Klondike Day." The festival featured a coronation of an Ice Princess and Ice Queen, a snow modeling contest, ski races, a skating party, and the dog derby. The race featured different classes and allowed people of all ages to harness their dogs to any sled they had at their disposal. This served as a way to connect sled dog racing to the people and bring the community together, thus bringing further attention to the sport throughout the area. The race was reintroduced in 2020 as a tribute dog mushers and their commitment to the sport. The race allows for spectators and gives people an opportunity to meet the racers and their dogs. This is meant to create a more interactive atmosphere surrounding the sport in the upper Midwest.

There are three typical types of sled dog races: sprint, mid-distance, and long-distance. These types can be broken down into sub-types. Sprint races cover relatively short distances of 4 to 25 miles/day, mid-distance races cover a total of 100 to 300 miles, and long-distance races cover 300 miles to more than 1,000 miles. Sprint races frequently are two- or three-day events with heats run on successive days with the same dogs on the same course. Mid-distance races are either heat races of 14 to 80 miles per day, or continuous races of 100 to 200 miles. (These categories are informal and may overlap to a certain extent.) Long-distance races may be continuous or stage races, in which participants run a different course each day, usually from a central staging location.

Generally, teams start one after another in equal time intervals, competing against the clock rather than directly against one another. This is due to logistic considerations of getting teams of dogs to the starting line for a clean timed start. Mass starts where all of the dog teams start simultaneously are popular in parts of Canada. Another mode of dogsled racing is the freight race, in which a specified weight per dog is carried in the sled.

Sprint races 
 Northern Pines Sled Dog Race, Iron River Wisconsin. Sprint and Mid-Distance races.
Akiak Dash- Annual 60 mile race from Bethel, Alaska to Akiak, Alaska and back
Apostle Islands Sled Dog Race - The largest sled dog race in the Midwestern United States, held at Bayfield, Wisconsin, on a 60-mile course.
Baltic Winter Cup — Series of sleddog races across the Baltic states, on snow as well as on dryland.
ADVANCE Sled Dog Challenge — The only snow based sled dog race event staged in Australia. Short-distance sprint races take place annually at Dinner Plain Village located north east in the Victorian High Country. see www.sleddogchallenge.com and www.visitdinnerplain.com.
American Dog Derby — Oldest dog sled race in the United States. The first American Dog Derby was held in 1917, and the races continued until being discontinued in the 1960s. The race was then revived in 1993 and still continues.
Avannaata Qimussersua is Greenland's championship in dog sled racing, using the typically Greenlandic fan formation with 12 dogs. The championship includes all West-Greenland settlements north of the Arctic circle and is held annually in March or April. The route covers about 40 kilometres, mainly on land but occasionally  crossing lake and sea ice. In 2013 and 2014, it was held in the town of Ilulissat.
Big Land Challenge Dog Team Race — Annual 20-kilometer race in Goose Bay, Labrador.
Open North American Championship — Culminating event of the Alaska Dog Mushers Association competition season.
1932 Olympics Race — Demonstration of race during the 1932 Olympic Games in Lake Placid, New York. The race was participated in by 5 contestants from Canada, and 7 contestants from the US. The race involved two 25.1-mile (40.5 km) heats. The race was won by Emile St. Godard.
Tok Dog Mushers Association Race of Champions — An Alaska Dog Mushers Association event hosted annually in Tok, Alaska for more than 50 years.
Western Alaska Championship Sled Dog Race — Annual three-day, 15–20-mile sprint race held in Dillingham, Alaska, as part of the Beaver Round-Up celebration.
Caledonia Classic Dog Sled Races - Annual 3-day event on and adjacent to beautiful Stuart Lake in Fort St. James, BC, Canada.  150 km races plus sprints on well maintained trails both on and off lake.
The British Siberian Husky Racing Association annual championship comprising 16 single day events held over 8 weekends, taking the best 11 results towards a final championship position.

Mid-distance races 
 WolfTrack Classic Sled Dog Race, Ely, Minnesota.
 Northern Pines Sled Dog Race, Iron River Wisconsin. Mid-Distance races. 
 Bogus Creek 150- annual 150 mile race from Bethel, Alaska to Bogus Creek and back. Held the same weekend as the Kuskokwim 300 and Akiak Dash with the goal of promoting dog mushing in the Yukon-Kuskokwim Delta of Southwestern Alaska
Can-Am Crown — Annual 250-mile race in Fort Kent, Maine.
Copper Basin 300 — Annual 300-mile race starting at Glennallen, Alaska.
CopperDog 150 — Annual 150-mile race starting at Calumet, MI.
Défi Taïga 200 — Annual 200-km race starting and ending in Fermont, Quebec.
Eagle Cap Extreme Sled Dog Race — Annual 200-mile race in Oregon.
Gin Gin 200 — Annual 200-mile sled dog race starting in Paxson, Alaska.
Hudson Bay Quest - Hudson Bay Quest. The Hudson Bay Quest is a 211-mile wilderness race run every March from Churchill, Manitoba to Gillam, Manitoba (reversed annually). Trail terrain will range from lakes, rivers, tundra and snow roads. Possible snow storms or ground blizzards may stop your progression for up to 36 hours. There is possibility of encountering severe weather conditions. Past races have had temperatures of +2 – 5 C with rain to -30 C with 40 kilometer winds equalling -45 C.
Klondike Dog Derby - Annual 40-mille race around Lake Minnetonka in Excelsior, Minnesota
Klondike 300 — Annual 300-mile race starting in Big Lake, Alaska.
Knik 200 Joe Redington Sr. Memorial Sled Dog Race — Annual 200-mile race starting in Knik, Alaska
Kuskokwim 300 — Annual 300-mile race on the Kuskokwim River in Alaska.
Nome-Council 200 — Annual 200-mile race from Nome to Council and back in Alaska. This race takes place in March and is an Iditarod Qualifier.
Nunavut Quest — Annual sled dog race from Igloolik, Nunavut to Arctic Bay, Nunavut.
Percy DeWolfe Memorial Mail Race — Annual 320 km race from Dawson City, Yukon to Eagle, Alaska and back.
Pirena — Annual stage race across the Pyrenees from west to east.
Qimualaniq Quest — A 320-kilometer race on Baffin Island, Nunavut, northern Canada. The 2009 race was canceled due to funding shortages.
 Tahquamenon Country Sled Dog Race. A multiple class race held at Muskallonge Lake State Park north of Newberry, MI. The race is held the second Saturday in January, and features pro and sport classes. 
Tustumena 200 — Annual 200-mile race starting in Clam Gulch, Alaska. Named for Tustumena Lake.
U.P. 200 — Annual 240-mile race in Marquette, Michigan.
Wyoming Stage Stop Sled Dog Race — Annual stage race in Wyoming and Utah.
Sandwich, New Hampshire — Annual 25 and 40-mile race in Sandwich, New Hampshire.
Caledonia Classic Dog Sled Races - Annual 3-day event on and adjacent to Stuart Lake in Fort St. James, BC, Canada. 150, 200 mile races plus sprints on well maintained trails both on and off lake.
Canadian Challenge Sled Dog Races - Annual 200 (8 dog Iditarod qualifier) and 325 mile (12 dog Yukon Quest and Iditarod qualifier) race held in February, Prince Albert Saskatchewan to La Ronge, Saskatchewan.
Ukkohalla-Paljakka Ajot - Annual mid-distance race at Hyrynsalmi-Puolanka area in Finland. 4- and 8-dogs classes, 2 x 35 or 2 x 40–50 km stage-race with 4 hours mandatory rest between stages.

Long-distance races 

All-Alaska Sweepstakes — First organized sled dog race. It is not run on an annual basis.
Alpirod — Defunct 1,000-km stage race in Italy, Switzerland, Germany, and France.
Femundløpet — 400-km and 600-km category race with start and finish in Røros, Norway.
Beringia — Annual 950-km race which takes place on Kamchatka, Russia. 
Finnmarksløpet — 1,000-km competition starting in Alta, Norway.
Hope Race — Defunct 1,200-mile race from Nome, Alaska to Anadyr, Russia, across the Bering Strait.
Iditarod Trail Sled Dog Race — Annual about 1,000-mile race in Alaska from Willow to Nome. Commemorates the 1925 Serum Run.
 Ivakkak - Annual long-distance race with alternating trail bridging different communities in Nunavik (Hudson Bay, Hudson Strait, Ungava Bay, Quebec); Launched in 2001 to promote traditional dogsledding and to revive the endangered breed of ISD (Inuit Sled Dogs). Only Inuit mushers are eligible to participate. 
John Beargrease Sled Dog Marathon — Annual 400-mile race starting in Duluth, Minnesota. The race is named after John Beargrease, who famously used a dogsled team to conduct his mail route.
Kobuk 440 - Annual 440-mile race starting and ending in Kotzebue, Alaska.
La Grande Odyssée — Annual  race in French Alps, from Portes du Soleil to Haute-Maurienne.
Pasvik Trail — Annual 500-km race starting in Kirkenes, Norway.
Vindelälvsdraget — Annual 400-km relay race on the Vindeln River in Sweden.
Race to the Sky, a 350-mile race held in Montana, United States 
Yukon Quest — Annual 1,000-mile race from Fairbanks, Alaska to Whitehorse, Yukon one year; then Whitehorse, Yukon to Fairbanks, Alaska the next.
Volga Quest - Annual 550-km race starting in Tolyatti, Russia and ending in Bolgar, Russia. The race is a celebration of the Volga River.
MusherIce 150 — long distance Race at Húsavík area In Iceland 4 - 6 dogs 3 x 50 km stage- with 7 hours mandatory rest between stages

Multiple events 
Several festivals or events host several races in a short span of time. In most cases, an event will host several different classes of events separated by distance and the number of dogs allowed. The festivals listed below may be affiliated with a mushing club.

American Dog Derby — Oldest dog sled race in the United States.
Caledonia Classic Dog Sled Races - Annual 3-day event on and adjacent to beautiful Stuart Lake in Fort St. James, BC, Canada. 150, 200 mile races plus sprints on well maintained trails both on and off lake.
Fur Rendezvous Festival — A winter festival in Anchorage, Alaska that includes several sled dog races including the World Championship Sled Dog Race, a sprint mushing event.
Haliburton Highlands Dogsled Derby — Collection of sprint races held annually in Haliburton, Ontario.
Kearney Dog Sled Races — Ontario's largest dog sled races held in Kearney, Ontario on the western boundary of historic Algonquin Park.  This race offers Sprint, 4 dog 4mile, 6 dog 6 Mile, Skijouring and a mid distance 10 dog staged (50 km / day / 2 day) race.  Held annually on the second weekend in February each year with a 20+ year history. 
Laconia World Championship Sled Dog Derby — Annual event of the Lakes Region Sled Dog Club in Laconia, New Hampshire that includes several classes of sprint races. The event has been hosted for more than 80 years.
Wanaka Sled Dog Festival — Multiple-race event hosted in Cardrona, New Zealand. Held in conjunction with the Kirsty Burn Classic and the Kirsty Burn.

Club seasons
Organized sprint mushing clubs typically host a series of small races as part of a season of competition. These races often change from one season to another, and are not notable enough on an individual level to warrant separate articles.

 Affiliated British Sleddog Activities hosts several events annually.
 The Alaska Dog Mushers Association is the largest sprint sled dog racing club in the world. It operates several races annually, and its season culminates in the Open North American Championship.
 The British Siberian Husky Racing Association hosts a series of two-day heats each year.
 Chugiak Dog Mushers host a series of races in and near Chugiak, Alaska annually.
 The Siberian Husky Club of NSW Inc holds races at several locations in the state of New South Wales, Australia between May and September each year.

Sled Dog Racing Breeds
The Alaskan Husky is said to be the most popular dog sledding breed. National Geographic says that when looking for qualities in a sled dog, you should look first at their feet. Since the races usually last for a long time, especially in the hard weather conditions, the feet of the dog tend to bear most of the work. Since softer feet don't usually do that well in those conditions and putting booties on dogs slow them down, that is what makes the Alaskan Husky so great at these races.

In addition, Alaskan Huskies are mixed-breed, which has been happening for many generations. The breeding focuses on the parts of the huskies that do well for racing: endurance, strength, speed, tough feet, and appetites. Arguably, next to having good feet, the ability to be harnessed and race with a team is the next most important trait for making the Alaska Husky the most popular and best dog sledding breed.

References

External links
 European Sled Dog Racing Association
 International Sled Dog Racing Association
 International Federation of Sleddog Sports